Caledonia is an unincorporated community in Rusk County, located in the U.S. state of Texas. According to the Handbook of Texas, the community had a population of 75 in 2000. It is located within the Longview, Texas metropolitan area.

History
Thomas Williams and William Elliott received land grants for the community in 1828. A post office was established at Caledonia in 1851 and remained in operation until 1905, with a brief interruption from 1866 to 1870. Sam T. Allen was the first postmaster. The community had three gristmills, a cotton gin, five churches, and 150 residents in 1883. Farmers in the area shipped cotton as the most common crop. The population went down to 50 in 1892, went up to 100 in 1896, to 25 in 1944, and then to 75 in 2000.

Geography

Education
Caledonia had its own school in 1883. Today, the community is served by the Henderson Independent School District.

Notes

Unincorporated communities in Cherokee County, Texas
Unincorporated communities in Texas